David McKee (1935–2022) was a British writer and illustrator.

David McKee may also refer to:

David McKee (ice hockey) (born 1983), American ice hockey player
David McKee (American politician) (1828–1862), American politician and Wisconsin pioneer
Dave McKee (1919–2005), Australian politician

See also
David McKey (born 1954), basketball coach